This is a list of members of the House of Assembly of Papua and New Guinea from 1964 to 1968. The House of Assembly had of 34 open electorates, 10 electorates reserved for non-indigenous members and 10 official members. The non-official members had been elected at the 1964 election.

Notes

References

List
Papua New Guinea politics-related lists